The St Croix Sopwith Triplane is an American homebuilt aircraft that was designed and produced by St Croix Aircraft of Corning, Iowa. When it was available the aircraft was supplied as a kit or in the form of plans for amateur construction. The aircraft is a full-size replica of the 1916 Sopwith Triplane fighter aircraft.

Design and development
The aircraft features a cantilever strut-braced triplane layout, a single-seat, with an optional two-seats-in-tandem open cockpit, fixed conventional landing gear and a single engine in tractor configuration.

The St Croix Sopwith Triplane differs from the original 1916 design in that it employs a welded steel tube fuselage, modern engine installation and other minor details. The Triplane is all covered in doped aircraft fabric.

The manufacturer estimated the construction time from the supplied kit as 4000 hours.

Operational history
By 1998 the company reported that 25 kits had been sold and 15 aircraft were completed and flying.

Specifications (St Croix Sopwith Triplane)

References

External links

Sopwith Triplane
1990s United States sport aircraft
1990s United States civil utility aircraft
Single-engined tractor aircraft
Triplanes
Homebuilt aircraft
Replica aircraft